Angostura Bridge is a suspension bridge that spans the Orinoco River at Ciudad Bolívar, Venezuela. The Spanish word Angostura means "narrows".
Built in 1967 at a cost of US$35million, the bridge has a total length of 1,678.50 meters, a distance of 1,272 meters between the two towers, and a main span of 712 meters. Until the opening of the Second Orinoco crossing 100 km downstream near Ciudad Guayana on 13 November 2006 it was the only bridge across the Orinoco.

References

External links

 

Suspension bridges in Venezuela
Buildings and structures in Ciudad Bolívar
Bridges completed in 1967
Buildings and structures in Bolívar (state)